Circumvalațiunii is a district of Timișoara. Its name comes from Calea Circumvalațiunii, one of the city's most important roads, which crosses it and is so named because it surrounds the historic center and the former fortress. Circumvalațiunii is one of the most expensive residential areas in Timișoara. Most of the buildings are from the 1970s when 11,400 homes were built for about 40,000 residents. The location of the district was directly related to the proximity to the industrial platform developed north of the railway.

Notes

References 

Districts of Timișoara